Cheong Hoi San (張海山 born 26 June 1998) is a Macanese international footballer who plays as a midfielder for Benfica (Macau) and the Macau national football team.

International career
Cheong was called up to the Macau senior team in February 2015 in preparation for 2018 FIFA World Cup qualification games, but would have to wait until November of the same year for his debut, which came against Hong Kong in a 2-0 defeat. He played in a 3-1 win over the Northern Mariana Islands in 2016, coming on as a 90th-minute substitute for Chan Man.

Career statistics

Club

Notes

International

References

External links
 

1998 births
Living people
Macau footballers
Macau international footballers
Association football midfielders
Windsor Arch Ka I players
C.D. Monte Carlo players
S.L. Benfica de Macau players
Liga de Elite players